Vatohandrina is a town and commune in Madagascar. It belongs to the district of Mananjary, which is a part of Vatovavy-Fitovinany Region. The population of the commune was estimated to be approximately 8,000 in 2001 commune census.

Only primary schooling is available. The majority 99.5% of the population of the commune are farmers.  The most important crop is coffee, while other important products are bananas, cassava and rice. Services provide employment for 0.5% of the population.

References and notes 

Populated places in Vatovavy-Fitovinany